Estadio Carlos Calderón is a football-specific stadium located in San Juan Pueblo, Atlántida, Honduras.  The stadium was first used for Liga Nacional matches for the first time in 2017, as C.D.S. Vida decided to temporarily relocate from Estadio Nilmo Edwards looking for larger crowds.  The stadium holds 2,000 people.

First Liga Nacional match
In February 2017, C.D.S. Vida requested a temporary change of venue looking for larger crowds.  Estadio Carlos Calderón was confirmed as the chosen venue.  The first ever Liga Nacional was played between Vida and Juticalpa F.C. ending in a 1–1 draw.

References

Carlos Calderón
C.D.S. Vida